Rioarribasuchus is a genus of aetosaur. Fossils have been found from the Chinle Formation in Arizona and New Mexico that date back to the upper Late Carnian stage of the Late Triassic.

History
"Desmatosuchus" chamaensis was named in 2003 and found from the Petrified Forest Member of the Chinle Formation in New Mexico. It was suggested to be more closely related to Paratypothorax, and so Parker gave it the name Heliocanthus. However, this new generic name was first proposed in an unpublished thesis, and thus did not meet ICZN regulations for the naming of a new taxon.

Later published papers reasserted the genetic separation of "D". chamaensis from Desmatosuchus, but the name Heliocanthus remained a nomen nudum until 2007, where it was thoroughly rediscribed in a paper published by the Journal of Systematic Palaeontology.

However, a paper previously published in late 2006 assigned "D". chamaensis to the new genus Rioarribasuchus. As a result, Heliocanthus is a junior objective synonym of Rioarribasuchus because the genus has seniority over Heliocanthus. However, the name Rioarribasuchus has been viewed as a violation of the code of ethics laid out in Appendix A of the International Code of Zoological Nomenclature and the papers that made use of the name have even been described as practicing "intellectual theft".

An article published later in 2007 in the  science blog Tetrapod Zoology brought these events to the attention of a wider range of readers, and the controversy was dubbed "Aetogate". This sparked continued debate regarding these issues among vertebrate paleontologists, which eventually led to an investigation by the Society of Vertebrate Paleontology into these issues and a response given in mid 2008 regarding the unethical conduct of the authors who described Rioarribasuchus.

References

External links

Tetrapod Zoology article explaining the taxonomic issues regarding Rioarribasuchus
PDF response given by the Society of Vertebrate Paleontology regarding the issues surrounding the naming and use of Rioarribasuchus
A timeline of publications and letters by Aetogate

Aetosaurs of North America
Chinle fauna
Prehistoric pseudosuchian genera